Rufisque Department is one of the 45 departments of Senegal and one of the four which make up the Dakar Region.

There are six urban communes within the department: Bargny, Sébikotane, Diamniadio, Jaxaay-Parcelle-Niakoul Rap, Sangalkam and Sendou. The rest of the department is divided into two arrondissements.

Rufisque Arrondissement is subdivided into three communes de arrondissement: Rufisque Est, Rufisque Nord and Rufisque Ouest.
Bambylor Arrondissement is subdivided into 3 rural districts (communautés rurales); 
 Yéne
 Bambylor
 Tivaouane Peulh-Niaga

Historic sites 

 The historic centre or Old Rufisque, lying between the East Canal, the West Canal, the railway line and the seafront.
 National printworks
 Former William Ponty school at Sébikotane
 Ancient dunes at Kounoune, Neolithic site
 Lake Retba, The Rose Lake or Pink Lake (coloured pink by algae)

References

Departments of Senegal
Dakar Region